Jody may refer to:

Jody (given name), a list of people with the given name
Jody (singer), French singer, real name Julie Erikssen
"Jody" (song), 1986 single by Jermaine Stewart
"Jody", a 1982 song by America from View from the Ground
"Jody", a 1971 song by The Jeff Beck Group from Rough and Ready
"Jody", a 1984 song by Tatsuro Yamashita from Big Wave
4083 Jody, asteroid
Jody or Jodie calls, in military cadence

See also

Jodie (disambiguation)